The province of West Sulawesi (Sulawesi Barat) in Indonesia is divided into six regencies (kabupaten), which are subdivided in turn administratively into 69 districts (kecamatan).

The districts of West Sulawesi, with the regency each falls into, are as follows:

Allu, Polewali Mandar
Anreapi, Polewali Mandar
Aralle, Mamasa
Balanipa, Polewali Mandar
Bambalamotu, Pasangkayu
Banggae, Majene
Baras, Pasangkayu
Binuang, Polewali Mandar
Bonehau, Mamuju
Budong-Budong, Mamuju
Campalagian, Polewali Mandar
Kalukku, Mamuju
Kalumpang, Mamuju
Karossa, Mamuju
Limboro, Polewali Mandar
Luyo, Polewali Mandar
Malunda, Majene
Mamasa, Mamasa
Mambi, Mamasa
Mamuju, Mamuju
Mapilli, Polewali Mandar
Matakali, Polewali Mandar
Matangnga, Polewali Mandar
Messawa, Mamasa
Nosu, Mamasa
Pamboang, Majene
Pana, Mamasa
Pangale, Mamuju
Papalang, Mamuju
Pasangkayu, Pasangkayu
Polewali, Polewali Mandar
Sampaga, Mamuju
Sarudu, Pasangkayu
Sendana, Majene
Sesena Padang, Mamasa
Simboro dan Kepulauan, Mamuju
Sumarorong, Mamasa
Tabang, Mamasa
Tabulahan, Mamasa
Tapalang Barat, Mamuju
Tapalang, Mamuju
Tapango, Polewali Mandar
Tinambung, Polewali Mandar
Tobadak, Mamuju
Tommo, Mamuju
Topoyo, Mamuju
Tutallu, Polewali Mandar
Wonomulyo, Polewali Mandar 

 
West Sulawesi